FGS may refer to:

 Faculty of Graduate Studies
 Federal German Ship, NATO designation for German Navy ships
 Federal Government of Somalia
 Federation of Genealogical Societies
 Fellow of the Geological Society (F.G.S.)
 FG syndrome
 Fine guidance sensor
 Fine Guidance Sensor (HST), FGS for the Hubble Space Telescope
 Fluorescence guided surgery
 Fo Guang Shan, a Buddhist monastic order
 Full genome sequencing
 Geranylfarnesyl diphosphate synthase
 Functional Gen Set, see Pathway analysis

See also 
 FG (disambiguation)